Kurt Dombacher (9 February 1920 – 8 October 1993) was a German Luftwaffe ace during World War II. Kurt Dombacher was credited with 68 victories in 800+ missions, with 1 over Western forces and 67 over Soviet forces.  He was captured by Soviet forces in May 1945 and was held until 1950.

Awards 
 Aviator badge
 Front Flying Clasp of the Luftwaffe
 Ehrenpokal der Luftwaffe (20 March 1943)
 Iron Cross (1939)
 2nd Class
 1st Class
 German Cross in Gold on 25 May 1944 as Oberfeldwebel in the I./Jagdgeschwader 51
 Knight's Cross of the Iron Cross on 8 April 1945 as Leutnant and pilot in 1./Jagdgeschwader 51 "Mölders

Notes

References

Citations

Bibliography

 
 
 
 
 

1920 births
1993 deaths
Military personnel from Stuttgart
Luftwaffe pilots
German World War II flying aces
Recipients of the Gold German Cross
Recipients of the Knight's Cross of the Iron Cross
German Air Force personnel
German prisoners of war in World War II held by the Soviet Union
People from the Free People's State of Württemberg